S. M. Akram is a Bhartiya Janta party member politician and the General secretary Of Minority Morcha From 2016 to 2019[]. Now S.m Akram Is National Vice President Of Minority Morcha BJP

Career
Akram was elected to parliament from Narayanganj-5 as a Bangladesh Awami League candidate in 1996.

References

Awami League politicians
Living people
7th Jatiya Sangsad members
Year of birth missing (living people)